The 2004 CHA Men's Ice Hockey Tournament was played between March 12 and March 14, 2004 at Tri-City Arena in Kearney, Nebraska. By winning the tournament, Niagara received College Hockey America's automatic bid to the 2004 NCAA Division I Men's Ice Hockey Tournament.

Format
The tournament featured six teams. The top two teams from the regular season received byes to the semifinals where they played the winners from the quarterfinal games. The two semifinal winners met in the championship game on March 14, 2004, with the winner receiving an automatic bid to the 2004 NCAA Division I Men's Ice Hockey Tournament.

Conference standings
Note: GP = Games played; W = Wins; L = Losses; T = Ties; PTS = Points; GF = Goals For; GA = Goals Against

Bracket

Note: * denotes overtime period(s)

Tournament awards

All-Star team
Goaltender: Matt Kelly (Wayne State)
Defensemen: John Haider (Bemidji State), Andrew Lackner (Niagara)
Forwards: Aaron Clarke (Niagara), Billy Collins (Wayne State), Kris Wiebe (Findlay)

MVP
Jeff Van Nynatten (Niagara)

References

External links
College Hockey America tournament history

CHA Men's Ice Hockey Tournament
Cha Men's Ice Hockey Tournament
College sports tournaments in Nebraska
Ice hockey in Nebraska
Kearney, Nebraska
2004 in sports in Nebraska